The 1998 Irish Masters was the twenty-fourth edition of the professional invitational snooker tournament, which took place from 24 to 29 March 1998. The tournament was played at Goffs in Kill, County Kildare, and featured twelve professional players.

Ronnie O'Sullivan won the final 9–3 against Ken Doherty, however O'Sullivan failed a post-final drugs test and tested positive for cannabis. He was stripped of the title and disqualified from the tournament with the victory awarded to Doherty.

Main draw

* Ronnie O'Sullivan was stripped of the title and disqualified from the tournament after winning 9–3. O'Sullivan failed a drugs test after testing positive for cannabis. Ken Doherty was awarded the title.

Notes

References

Irish Masters
Irish Masters
Irish Masters
Irish Masters